Shoyna (Nenets: Сояна’я, Sojanaꜧja) (also spelled Shoina) is a coastal village (selo), located on the Kanin Peninsula in northern Nenets Autonomous Okrug, Russia. It had a population of 300 as of 2010.

It was founded in the 1930s by fishing families who named the settlement after the Shoyna ("cemetery" in Komi language) River. An abundance of fish and sea life led to prosperity within the collective farm organized there, and by the 1950s some 1,500 People lived in Shoyna with a fishing fleet numbering more than seventy vessels.

Ultimately, reckless trawling led to the utter annihilation of the benthic life, which decimated the fishery. More than half of the village is now buried under sand dunes deposited by the wind. It is thought that damage to permafrost and destruction of the sea bottom released the sand, which has overwhelmed residents' abilities to control the drifts. The collective farm no longer operates; today, just three hundred inhabitants live at Shoyna, supported mainly by unemployment benefits and pensions.

There is a lighthouse at Shoyna, built in 1960 as a navigational aid to mariners on the White Sea.  Several shipwrecks line the shore as a testament to the treacherous waters. No roads or railroads connect the area with the south. Transportation to the outside world is by ship or air. The civilian airport is a dirt runway 650 metres in length. Local travel is by "truckcycles" (motorcycles with truck wheels).

In 1994, documentary filmmakers came to Shoyna and shot footage of the community. The resulting film, Zanesyonnyye Vetrom (Blown in with the Wind), was released in 2000. New documentary Between Sky and Sand (2017) 

Shoyna lies immediately south of the 167 square kilometer Shoyninsky State Nature Reserve, established in 1997 to protect the spring and autumn staging area for the lesser white-fronted goose (Anser erythropus), an Arctic species threatened with extinction. In 2002, Dutch researchers discovered that the nearby Shoyna marsh is an important stopover site for brent and barnacle geese, with counts approaching almost ten percent of the total Russian flyway population.

Climate

Shoyna has a subarctic climate (Dfc) with short, moderately warm summers and long, cold winters.

References

External links
Photos by Alexey Golubtsov
2005 photographs by Sergey Maximishin 
More photographs
New York Times article
youtube.com – RT Documentary: Mysterious Sands of Russia. Russian village surviving in the sands

Rural localities in Nenets Autonomous Okrug